The name Meranti was used to name three tropical cyclones in the northwestern Pacific Ocean. The name was contributed by Malaysia, which refers to a type of tree.

 Typhoon Meranti (2004) (T0412, 14W) – a typhoon which stayed at sea throughout its lifetime, and also the first of a record nine named storms to form during the 2004 season.
 Severe Tropical Storm Meranti (2010) (T1010, 11W) – a short-lived tropical storm which was upgraded by JMA to a severe tropical storm in post-analysis; peaked as a Category 1-equivalent tropical cyclone before making landfall in Fujian, China.
 Typhoon Meranti (2016) (T1614, 16W, Ferdie) – a strong typhoon that struck Taiwan and China, causing at least $4.7 billion worth of damage.

The name Meranti was retired following the 2016 typhoon and was replaced with Nyatoh, first used during the 2021 season. It refers to a trade name for the wood coming from a number of hardwood species of the genera Palaquium and Payena in the Southeast Asian rainforest.

Pacific typhoon set index articles